Rampage is a 1963 American adventure film directed by Phil Karlson and starring Robert Mitchum, Jack Hawkins and Elsa Martinelli. It features a musical score by Elmer Bernstein and was based on the eponymous novel by Alan Caillou, published in 1961.

Plot

The story centers on a group of big game hunters who travel to Malaysia.

Cast
 Robert Mitchum ... Harry Stanton
 Jack Hawkins ... Otto Abbot
 Elsa Martinelli ... Anna
 Sabu ... Talib
 Cely Carillo ... Chep
 Émile Genest ... Schelling
 Stefan Schnabel ... Sakai Chief
 David Cadiente ... Baka

Production
Filming started in Hawaii in October 1962.

References

External links
 

1963 films
1960s adventure drama films
American adventure drama films
Films about hunters
Films set in Malaysia
Films directed by Phil Karlson
Films based on British novels
1960s English-language films
1960s American films